Trifucol is a phlorotannin found in the brown algae Scytothamnus australis and Analipus japonicus.

References 

Phlorotannins
Natural phenol trimers